SockMonkey Studios was a British video game developer, founded by Teesside University graduates Bob Makin and Darren Cuthbert, in Middlesbrough, North East England.

History 
Founded in February 2013 with the help of DigitalCity, prior to SockMonkey Studios Makin and Cuthbert worked at other studios including Team17, Jagex and Iguana.

Makin and Cuthbert were later joined by industry veteran Darren Falcus.  Building their foundation on primarily work for hire jobs, the studio collaborated with numerous video game companies such as SEGA, Double Eleven and Team 17  to assist in the porting of their games to other consoles.

After setting up their offices on Victoria Road in Middlesbrough, in 2015 they moved their headquarters to the Phoenix Building at Teesside University, moving again to Boho 5  as the studio grew and as of 2021 reside at 16/26 Albert Road North in Middlesbrough.

From its inception, the studio experienced growth due to increasing demand within the gaming industry and by 2020 had added dozens of positions. In 2019 alone they reported doubling the headcount in their Teesside office.

In 2020, during an expansion phase, Ron Ashtiani - former CEO of Sumo Group's Atomhawk Business - was added to the board of directors. During 2020, the studio also received funding from Northern Powerhouse Investment Fund.

In February 2023 it was announced that SockMonkey Studios had been acquired by Behaviour Interactive, becoming Behaviour UK - North.

Contract work 
Although the studio also worked on full-scale development SockMonkey was predominantly a work-for-hire studio, having worked globally on contracts for both PC and console, including US-based developers such as tinyBuild and Outfit7.

Awards

Games

References 

Video game development companies
Companies based in Middlesbrough
Video game companies of the United Kingdom
Video game companies established in 2013
2013 establishments in England
British companies established in 2013
2023 mergers and acquisitions